Ivica Matković may refer to:

Ivica Matković (football coach) (born 1953), Croatian football coach
Ivica Matković (Ustasha) (1913–1945), administrator at the Jasenovac World War II concentration camp in Croatia